Intrigue may refer to:

TV and film

 Intrigue (1920 film), a 1920 German silent drama film
 Intrigue (1942 film), a Spanish film
 Intrigue (1947 film), 1947 film directed by Edwin L. Marin
 The Intrigue, 1916 silent film drama
 "Intrigue" (Revenge), sixth episode of the American television series Revenge

Music
 Intrigue, Sámi band from Norway
 The Intrigues, soul trio from Philadelphia, Pennsylvania

Other uses
 Intrigue (solitaire), card game
 The Oldsmobile Intrigue, a model of automobile
 The USS Intrigue (AM-253), a minesweeper built for the U.S. Navy during World War II

See also
 Cloak and dagger in Popular culture
 Cabalism
 Obscurantism, blurring the lines between groups, suggesting vague points of agreement between topics or assumptions
 Politainment
 Halloween, intrigue is used in haunted attractions such as haunted houses and halloween theme park rides
 Roasting, comedic jabs and parodies or satire that features intrigue building
 
 Intriguer, a 2010 album by Crowded House